Darko Lazić (born 19 July 1994) is a Serbian professional footballer who plays as a defender for Bosnian Premier League club Borac Banja Luka.

Club career

Red Star Belgrade
Lazić made his professional debut for Red Star Belgrade on 26 May 2013, in a Serbian SuperLiga match versus Vojvodina.

Anzhi Makhachkala
On 23 June 2015, Lazić signed a four-year contract with Russian Premier League side Anzhi Makhachkala.

Alanyaspor
On 31 January 2017, Lazić moved to Turkey, signing with Alanyaspor. While at Alanyaspor, he was loaned out to Denizlispor for the rest of the 2017–18 season. He left Alnyaspor in October 2018.

Sarajevo
On 11 January 2019, Lazić signed a one and a healf-year contract with Bosnian Premier League club Sarajevo. He made his official debut for Sarajevo in a 3–0 win over Tuzla City on 23 February 2019. Lazić scored his first goal for Sarajevo on 6 April 2019, in a 0–3 away win against Željezničar in the Sarajevo derby.

He won his first trophy with the club on 15 May 2019, after Sarajevo beat Široki Brijeg in the final and won the 2018–19 Bosnian Cup. Three days after the cup final, on 18 May 2019, Lazić also won the league title with Sarajevo after the club beat Zvijezda 09 4–0 at home.

He won his second league title with the club on 1 June 2020, though after the 2019–20 Bosnian Premier League season was ended abruptly due to the COVID-19 pandemic in Bosnia and Herzegovina and after which Sarajevo were by default crowned league champions for a second consecutive time. The next day, on 2 June, Lazić left Sarajevo after his contract with the club expired.

Radnički Niš
On 20 October 2020, Lazić returned to the Serbian SuperLiga, joining Radnički Niš.

Return to Sarajevo
On 17 June 2021, Lazić returned to the Bosnian Premier League, once again signing with Sarajevo.

International career
Lazić represented Serbia on various youth international levels.

Career statistics

Club

Honours
Sarajevo
Bosnian Premier League: 2018–19, 2019–20 
Bosnian Cup: 2018–19

See also
List of FK Sarajevo players

References

External links
Darko Lazić profile on Sarajevo official website
Darko Lazić stats at utakmica.rs

1994 births
Living people
People from Smederevska Palanka
Serbian footballers
Serbia youth international footballers
Serbia under-21 international footballers
Association football defenders
Red Star Belgrade footballers
FK Spartak Subotica players
FC Anzhi Makhachkala players
Alanyaspor footballers
FK Sarajevo players
FK Radnički Niš players
FK Borac Banja Luka players
Russian Premier League players
Serbian SuperLiga players
Süper Lig players
Premier League of Bosnia and Herzegovina players
Serbian expatriate footballers
Expatriate footballers in Russia
Serbian expatriate sportspeople in Russia
Expatriate footballers in Turkey
Serbian expatriate sportspeople in Turkey
Expatriate footballers in Bosnia and Herzegovina
Serbian expatriate sportspeople in Bosnia and Herzegovina